Jesús Omar Aramayo Cordero (born June 8, 1947 in Puno) is a Peruvian poet and composer.

Poetry works
Aleteos al horizonte (1963)
El llanto de los bolsillos (1964)
La estela del vacío (1964)
Antigua canción (1965)
Malby, el dolor pensativo (1965)
Lámpara ciega
Prohibido pisar el grass (1970)
Axial (1975)
Poemas de Omar Aramayo (impresos a mimiografo desde 1980)
Los dioses (1992)
El sol deja la piel (1992)
Caleidoscopio (2000)

Bibliography
La música en el siglo XX de Enrique Pinilla en La música en el Perú, Editorial Patronato Popular y Porvenir Pro Música Clásica, Lima, Perú, 1988.
Diccionario Histórico y Biográfico del Perú: Siglos XV-XX, 1986, Editorial Milla Batres, Lima, Perú.
Poesía peruana del 70, César Toro Montalvo, 2004, Colección Perú Lee.
Enciclopedia Temática del Perú: Literatura, Ricardo Gónzalez Vigil, El Comercio, 2005.
Antología de la poesía peruana Tomo II, Alberto Escobar, Ediciones Peisa, Lima, Perú, 1973.

20th-century Peruvian poets
Peruvian composers
Peruvian male composers
1947 births
Living people
People from Puno Region
Peruvian male poets
20th-century male writers